Calisto bruneri is a butterfly of the family Nymphalidae. It is endemic to Cuba, where it occurs in the western parts of the Nipe-Sagua-Baracoa Mountains. The species inhabits rainforests, wet sclerophyllous low forests and pine forests.

The length of the forewings is 16–19 mm for males and 18–21 mm for females. Adults have been observed taking nectar from flowers of Scaevola wrightii.

References

Calisto (butterfly)
Butterflies of Cuba
Endemic fauna of Cuba
Butterflies described in 1949